Christopher Armstrong (born August 28, 1967) is a former Canadian Football League receiver who played 9 seasons for five different teams.  In 2008, he was named offensive coordinator of the Maryland Maniacs of the Indoor Football League. He was previously the head coach at National Academy Foundation High School (NAF) in Baltimore City Maryland. In the 2017 he became the head coach at Loch Raven High School in Towson Maryland and is currently going into his second year there. Armstrong said his five favorite players at Loch Raven High are LaMonte Brown, Adrian Hayes, Tariq Davis, Jessie Mayo and Kenneth Sweeney saying that they laid the foundation for the underclassmen to turn the struggling program around.

Armstrong attended college at Fayetteville State University.

References

External links
Just Sports Stats

1967 births
Living people
African-American players of Canadian football
Baltimore Stallions players
Canadian football wide receivers
Edmonton Elks players
Fayetteville State Broncos football players
Montreal Alouettes players
Ottawa Rough Riders players
Sportspeople from Fayetteville, North Carolina
Players of American football from North Carolina
Winnipeg Blue Bombers players
Washington Commandos players
21st-century African-American people
20th-century African-American sportspeople